Senator Gaston may refer to:

William Gaston (Massachusetts politician) (1820–1894), Massachusetts State Senate
William Gaston (1778–1844), North Carolina State Senate